The Aceh bulbul (Pycnonotus snouckaerti) is a species of songbird in the bulbul family of passerine birds. It is found in the mountains of north-western Sumatra and is endemic to the island. Its natural habitat is tropical moist lowland forest.

Taxonomy and systematics
The Aceh bulbul was formerly considered as a subspecies of the orange-spotted bulbul until split by the IOC in 2016. Most other authorities have not yet recognized this split.

References

Aceh bulbul
Birds of Sumatra
Endemic fauna of Sumatra
Aceh bulbul